Chen Shih-yung (12 September 1948 – 7 February 2022) was a Taiwanese politician.

As a member of the Kuomintang, he served as County Magistrate of Chiayi from 1989 to 1993, and later joined the People First Party. He died in Chiayi County on 7 February 2022, at the age 73.

References

1948 births
2022 deaths
20th-century Taiwanese politicians
Magistrates of Chiayi County
People First Party (Taiwan) politicians
National Taiwan University alumni
Harvard University alumni
Academic staff of Soochow University (Taiwan)
Kuomintang politicians in Taiwan